VH1: All Access is VH1's series of original specials that offer an insider's look into the world of rock & roll, from money to fashion to feuds and more.

History
All Access is a lifestyle magazine show that embraces celebrity and current pop culture, or as they like to say: "It's not rocket science, it's only Rock 'n' roll".

External links
 

2000s American television series
VH1 original programming